St Pancras Old Church is a Church of England parish church in Somers Town, Central London. It is dedicated to the Roman martyr Saint Pancras, and is believed by many to be one of the oldest sites of Christian worship in England. The church is situated on Pancras Road in the London Borough of Camden, with the surrounding area and its international railway station taking its name.

History

Parish
Originally, the parish of St Pancras stretched from close to Oxford Street almost to Highgate. In the early Middle Ages there was a centre of population in the vicinity of what is now known as the old church. However, in the 14th century the population abandoned the site and moved to what is now Kentish Town. The reasons for this were probably the vulnerability of the plain around the church to flooding (the River Fleet, which is now underground, runs through it) and the availability of better wells at Kentish Town, where there is less clay in the soil.

The church subsequently fell into disrepair. Towards the end of the 18th century, services were only held in the church on one Sunday each month; on other weeks, the same congregation would use a chapel in Kentish Town. 18th and early 19th century urban expansion led to the construction of the capacious St Pancras New Church on what was then the "New Road" (Euston Road, about a km away). The old building lost its status as the parish church when the New Church was consecrated in 1822, and became a chapel of ease.

Richard Granger is named as parson of the church of St Pancras, in 1446.

Early history
Evidence for the early history of the church is scanty. It is considered by some to have existed since AD 314, although there is no archaeological or documentary evidence to support this.  The claim is discussed below under Legendary origins.

Phil Emery and Pat Miller discuss the issue in 'Archaeological findings at the site of the St Pancras Burial Ground and its vicinity'. The 1847 reconstruction of the medieval church revealed Roman tiles in the fabric of its tower and an inscribed altar stone dated to  AD 625, which might suggest an early 7th-century foundation. The original cemetery around the church appears to have been sub-circular like many late Saxon cemeteries.

Remnants of medieval features and references in the Domesday Book suggest it pre-dates the Norman Conquest.

According to a Victorian architect, Robert Lewis Roumieu, involved in the works:  The old church was principally late Tudor. When it was pulled down to be rebuilt, several small Norman columns, pilaster piers and other remains of a Norman edifice were found among the materials used in the wall, leaving no doubt but that the original church had been a Norman structure which had been at some time completely rebuilt and part used as building material in the reconstruction.

After the Reformation the isolation and decay of the church made it a tempting resort for Catholics: indeed, it was said that the last bell which tolled for the Mass in England was at St Pancras. St Pancras (and to a lesser degree Paddington Church) were the only places in London where Roman Catholics were permitted to be buried. Among the several Catholics buried in the churchyard was Johann Christian Bach, youngest son of Johann Sebastian Bach. His name was misspelled in the burial register as John Cristian Back.

Restoration

As it stood in the early 19th century, the church consisted of an unaisled nave, a chancel without a chancel arch and a western tower. The south porch had served as a vestry since the 18th century.

By 1847 the Old Church was derelict, but in view of the growth of population in the southern part of the parish, it was decided to restore it. (Victorian restoration of churches is not what we understand today by the phrase building restoration.) The architect of the alterations was Alexander Dick Gough. The old tower was removed, allowing the nave to be extended westwards, and a new tower was built on the south side. The south porch was removed, and a new vestry was added on the north side. The whole exterior of the church was refaced or reworked. The enlargement and the addition of galleries increased the capacity of the church from about 120 to 500.

There were further restorations in 1888 by Arthur Blomfield with the reredos by C E Buckeridge; in 1925 when the plaster ceiling and the side galleries were removed, and in 1948 following Second World War bomb damage. The building was designated a grade II* listed building on 10 June 1954.

Present organisation
The church has a chaplaincy to the nearby St Pancras Hospital and since 1 June 2003 has formed part of the Old St Pancras Team Ministry (which also includes St Michael's Church, Camden Town, St Mary's Church, Somers Town and St Paul's Church, Camden Square).  On 11 December 2007 it marked the opening of the nearby St Pancras International station with a bilingual service and a twinning with the Church of Saint-Vincent-de-Paul, Paris, near the Gare du Nord, Paris. In 2013 an official appeals project was launched to raise the funds necessary to preserve the church and grounds.

As a traditional Anglo-Catholic church that rejects the ordination of women as priests and bishops, it receives alternative episcopal oversight from the Bishop of Fulham (currently Jonathan Baker).

Legendary origins

As early as 1593 the cartographer John Norden had commented in his Speculum Britanniae that the dilapidated St Pancras church looked older than St Paul's Cathedral. By the 18th century there seems to have been a local belief that St Pancras was of very great age, perhaps the oldest church in England. The contemporary London historian William Maitland dismissed this as a "vulgar Tradition", and suggested that there was confusion with the ancient church with the same dedication in the grounds of St Augustine's Abbey in Canterbury, which was said to have been converted from a pagan temple by St Augustine of Canterbury in 598.

In 1870 local historian Samuel Palmer reported "This old and venerable church is said to be the first Christian place of worship in the county of Middlesex in the eighth or ninth century." Later attempts to prove an early date for the foundation of the church include the claim by J. Carter Rendell (vicar 1912–26) that a medieval altar slab marked with five consecration crosses, found during the 19th-century building works, could be dated to the 6th century.

An earlier vicar is said to have claimed to have seen in the Vatican Library a manuscript mentioning that St Pancras church was built in the 9th century, and another to have seen a similar document placing the foundation in the 4th century.

Information panels outside the church today state that it "stands on one of Europe’s most ancient sites of Christian worship, possibly dating back to the early 4th century" and has been a "site of prayer and meditation since 314 AD". The case for these claims seems first to have been argued by local historian Charles Lee in 1955, who wrote:

There can be little doubt that a Roman encampment was situated opposite the site of St Pancras Church about this period, and that the church is on the site of a Roman Compitum, which served as a centre of public worship and public meeting... It seems probable that the Roman Compitum at St Pancras was adapted to Christian worship shortly after the restoration of religious freedom in 313 (taking its name from the recently-martyred Pancras).
Lee's "Roman encampment" was "Caesar’s Camp at Pancras called the Brill", identified by the antiquary William Stukeley in the 1750s. However, even Stukeley's contemporaries could see no trace of this camp, and considered that Stukeley had let his imagination run away with him. Gillian Tindall has suggested that the lumps and bumps in the fields to the west of the church that Stukeley interpreted as a Roman camp were actually traces of the original medieval village of St Pancras, before the centre of the settlement moved north to the area now known as Kentish Town.

Lee's use of the word compitum, properly a Roman temple or shrine situated at a crossroads, indicates his indebtedness to the work of Montagu Sharpe (1856–1942), a Middlesex magistrate, former chairman of the Middlesex County Council and amateur historian and archaeologist. Sharpe had proposed, in a book first published in 1919, that the area of the county of Middlesex had in Roman times been subject to the form of land division known as centuriation, marked out by roads in a regular grid pattern covering the whole county. Sharpe noted, when plotting his gridlines, that a number of ancient parish churches appeared to be on or close to intersections, or at least on road alignments. He concluded that these churches must therefore stand on the sites of pagan compita, and represent the deliberate conversion of pagan temples to Christian use by early missionaries to the Middle Saxons in the 7th century. And St Pancras Old Church is one of those marked on Sharpe's map.

The above makes it clear that there is no reliable evidence for an early date for St Pancras, and that the claims are all based on unsupported speculation, with no archaeological or documentary evidence to back the speculation up.

Internal monuments

The church contains the grave of Samuel Cooper (or Cowper), the miniaturist, against its east wall.

Churchyard

The churchyard, which is the largest green space in the locality, is managed by the London Borough of Camden. It has some fine mature trees, and was restored in the first few years of the 21st century.

The graveyard served not only as a burial place for the parishioners but also for Roman Catholics from all around London. They included many French refugees (émigrés), especially priests, who had fled the Revolution, one of them the spy Chevalier d'Éon.  Notable people buried in the churchyard include the notorious colonial administrator Joseph Wall who was executed for cruelty in 1802. The famous vampire writer ("The Vampyre"  published in 1819) and physician John William Polidori (buried in 1821), the composers Carl Friedrich Abel and Johann Christian Bach, the eighteenth child of Johann Sebastian Bach, and the sculptor John Flaxman. William Franklin, the illegitimate son of Benjamin Franklin and last colonial Governor of New Jersey, was interred here in 1814.  There is a spousal memorial tomb for philosophers and writers Mary Wollstonecraft and William Godwin, though their remains are now in Bournemouth. In 2009, commemorations of the 250th anniversary of Wollstonecraft's birth were held by various groups, both inside the church and at the gravestone. In the 17th and 18th centuries, many foreign dignitaries and aristocrats were buried in the graveyard; they are commemorated on the Burdett-Coutts Memorial Sundial, an elaborate memorial commissioned by the philanthropist Angela Burdett-Coutts, 1st Baroness Burdett-Coutts.

The architect John Soane designed a tomb for his wife and himself in the churchyard, which is now Grade I listed. This mausoleum may have provided the inspiration for the design by Giles Gilbert Scott of the iconic red telephone boxes.

Other people associated with the churchyard include the poet Percy Bysshe Shelley and the future Mary Shelley, who planned their 1814 elopement over meetings at the grave of her mother, Mary Wollstonecraft, mentioned above.  Charles Dickens mentions it by name in his 1859 novel A Tale of Two Cities, making it the location of body snatching to provide corpses for dissection at medical schools, a common practice at the time. Burials in the churchyard eventually ceased under the Extramural Interment Act in 1854, and St Pancras and Islington Cemetery was opened in East Finchley.  In the mid-1860s, the young Thomas Hardy was in charge of the excavation of part of the graveyard, in the course of the construction of the Midland Railway's London terminus. More burials were removed in 2002.

The churchyard was reopened in June 1877 as St Pancras Gardens, following the movement to allow conversion of disused burial grounds into public gardens. Angela Burdett-Coutts, an important local benefactress, laid the foundation stone of the memorial sundial she had presented.

A recent addition is a polished marble stone at the entrance to the church, a collaboration between and a gift from the poet Jeremy Clarke and the sculptor Emily Young. It is inscribed: "And I am here / in a place / beyond desire or fear", an extract from the long poem "Praise" by Clarke.

Names of note listed on the Burdett Coutts Memorial as lost

This impressive monument was erected in 1877 when the northern half of the churchyard was formalised as a public park, clearing most of the smaller gravestones. It lists stones lost to this and earlier clearances for the railways.

William Brett (d.1828), artist and engraver
Henry Burdett, goldsmith (d.1736) and ancestor of Angela Burdett-Coutts, 1st Baroness Burdett-Coutts (the probable inspiration for the monument)
Mary Burke, wife of John Burke (genealogist), author of Burke's Peerage
Tiberius Cavallo, physicist and philosopher
John Danby, musician
Arthur Richard Dillon, French archbishop (later re-interred in France)
Rufane Shaw Donkin, military hero who committed suicide
Chevalier d'Eon, spy and fencer
John Flaxman, sculptor
John Fleetwood, baronet
Bonaventure Giffard and his father Andrew Giffard
John Ernest Grabe, theologian
John Gurney, judge; this grave is intact and legible but the inscription faces the boundary
Louis Charles d'Hervilly
Giacomo Leoni, architect
Maurice Margarot, reformer
Thomas Mazzinghi, father of Joseph Mazzinghi
Arthur O'Leary, Franciscan preacher
Pasquale Paoli, Corsican hero (later re-interred in Corsica)
Stephen Paxton, musician
Simon François Ravenet, engraver
Mary Slingsby, actress
Charles Henry Talbot, baronet
Henry Tempest (d.1753)
John Walker, lexicographer; this monument still survives and was independently restored by Angela Burdett-Coutts

Other known burials
see  and 
Carl Friedrich Abel, composer
Johann Christian Bach, composer
Peter van Bleeck, artist
Francis Blyth, Carmelite friar and Roman Catholic priest
Edward Boteler (d.1681), MP for Poole
George Chalmers, artist
Jeremy Collier, bishop
Timothy Cunningham (d.1789), founder of the Cunningham Medal
Charles Dillon, 10th Viscount Dillon (d.1741) and Lady Dillon (d.1751) and other family members
Thomas Dongan, 2nd Earl of Limerick
William Franklin, son of Benjamin Franklin
Bevil Higgons, historian
Antoinette-Cecile de Saint-Huberty, opera singer
Abraham Langford, auctioneer and playwright
Thomas Mackworth (d.1744), baronet
Joseph Richards (d.1738), baronet
Thomas Scheemakers (1740–1808), sculptor
Giovanna Sestini (1749–1814), opera singer 
Giambattista Tocco, Duke de Sicignano (c.1760–1793), ambassador from the Kingdom of Naples to Great Britain, committed suicide shortly after his arrival in London in 1793.
Henry Sidgier, holder of a 1782 patent on a design for a washing machine
Duncan Stewart of Ardsheal, clan chief
Benjamin Turney (1755–1836), doctor trained at St Thomas. Lived for some years in Jamaica on Golden Grove Sugar Plantation.
Joseph Wall, governor of Coree in West Africa, hanged for flogging a soldier to death
Ned Ward, publican and comic author (no memorial)
Samuel Webbe, composer (monument and inscription survives but its upper obelisk is missing)
Jonathan Wild, criminal
John Wittewrong (d.1743), baronet
Abraham Woodhead, academic
William Woollett, engraver (no monument, despite not being listed on the Burdett Coutts memorial as an important grave lost). Woollett certainly was important as he was nationally recognised by a memorial in Westminster Abbey.

Popular culture 
On 28 July 1968, The Beatles were photographed in the churchyard grounds, in a famous series of pictures designed to promote the single "Hey Jude" and the White Album. A memorial bench bears a plaque commemorating the group's "Mad Day Out".

The video for Lene Lovich's 1979 hit "Bird Song" was filmed in the church and churchyard.

In 2013, British R&B singer Sam Smith performed two concerts at the church. The live version of "I've Told You Now" was included on deluxe editions of their album In the Lonely Hour.

On 24 September 2014, singer Claudia Brücken, best known for her work with German electronic group Propaganda, performed a solo show at the church.

St Pancras Old Church is frequently mentioned in the Bryant and May detective series by author Christopher Fowler.

References

Sources

Further reading

'

External links

Official website
Official diocesan info
St Pancras Old Church section at the Survey of London online.
Excavations at St Pancras Burial Ground 2002–2004 British Archaeology magazine (April 2006)
Architectural review based on church guide
Saint Pancras Churchyard at Find A Grave
History Project Blog

Grade II* listed churches in London
Church of England church buildings in the London Borough of Camden
Diocese of London
Anglo-Catholic church buildings in the London Borough of Camden
St Pancras, London
Anglo-Catholic churches in England receiving AEO